Undibacterium oligocarboniphilum is a Gram-negative, oxidase positive,  catalase positive, flagellated, rod-shaped bacterium of the genus Undibacterium which was isolated from purified water. Its 16S rRNA gene sequence analysis has shown that it belongs to the family Oxalobacteraceae.

References

External links
Type strain of Undibacterium oligocarboniphilum at BacDive -  the Bacterial Diversity Metadatabase

Burkholderiales
Bacteria described in 2011